A Collection 1984–1989 is a 1995 greatest hits compilation of her by Jane Siberry. It was released in Canada and the United States. Later that year, the compilation Summer in the Yukon was released in the United Kingdom.

Track listing 
Source: Discogs; Amazon

References 

1995 greatest hits albums
Jane Siberry albums